VH1 Latin America was a music channel from ViacomCBS-owned ViacomCBS Networks Americas. The network was launched on April 1, 2004 exclusively on Cablevisión D.F. in Mexico, and in the rest of the region some months later. The channel targeted audience from 19 to 44 years old and played local and international music videos from the 1970s to the 2000s. It also aired famous countdowns from VH1 United States. It reached most of the satellite and cable systems in Latin America. VH1 Soul, another channel of MTV Networks and sister channel of VH1 was also available in the region.

History 

The channel was launched on April 1, 2004 only on Cablevisión in Mexico. Eventually, it started reaching other countries, and as of 2006 it was available in most of the countries of Latin America.

On April 27, 2009 the channel launched a new image, with new idents, bumpers and new colors for the logo. The new identity was called "look & feel" and represents the beginnings of color television.

On April 29, 2013 the channel began to use the current logos and idents used by its parent channel.

On October 7, 2020 the channel closed down and was replaced by VH1 Europe.

Shows on VH1 Latin America

Last programming (2015-2020) 
 Old Is Cool (formerly VH1 Clásico) 
 Video Hits One
 Videografía
 Best Of

Former programming (2004-2015) 
 Antes Y Después
 80/90
 Neo... Música Nueva
 10 Clips 10
 Top 20 VH1
 VH1 Solar
 Música +
 Música -
 I Love
 La Crème
 Rock N' Roll High School
 Gene Simmons' Rock School
 The Fabulous Life of... (Sometimes called La Fabulosa Vida de...)
 Planet Rock Profiles
 Movies That Rock
 Exposed
 Comedy Central Present
 Stand Up VH1
 First Look
 Man Caves
 3
 Famous Crime Scenes
 That Metal Show
 Cyndi Lauper: Still So Unusual
 Video Killed The Radio Star
 VH1 Storytellers
 Sziget Festival
 MTV Unplugged

Reality shows
 Flavor of Love
 I Love New York
 I Love Money
 Hogan Knows Best
 The Surreal Life
 Rock of Love
 The Graham Norton Effect
 The Graham Norton Show
 RuPaul's Drag Race (season 2)

Controversy 
On January 29, 2007, VTR added the network in a channel slot timeshared with GolTV. This caused anger among its subscribers, which only grew when VTR added FX to the same channel slot on May, making VH1 available only after midnight. In August, the channel was pulled off with no notification given. Despite this, VH1 was added back in early-2009 on its own channel slot. The channel was withdrawn in mid-April 2020.

See also
VH1
VH1 Brasil
MTV Networks Latin America

Music organizations based in Mexico
Television channels and stations established in 2004
Spanish-language television stations
VH1
Television channel articles with incorrect naming style
Television channels and stations disestablished in 2020